The 1968-69 NBA season was the Bulls' 3rd season in the NBA.

Draft picks

Roster

Regular season

Season standings

x – clinched playoff spot

Record vs. opponents

Game log

Player statistics

Awards and records
Jerry Sloan, NBA All-Defensive First Team
Jerry Sloan, NBA All-Star Game

References

Chicago
Chicago Bulls seasons
Chicago Bulls
Chicago Bulls